S98 may refer to:
 S98 (New York City bus) serving Staten Island
 , formerly SAS Emily Hobhouse, a submarine of the South African Navy
 Vista Field, in Benton County, Washington, United States
 S98, a non-geographic postcode in Sheffield, England